Fabian Greilinger (born 13 September 2000) is a German professional footballer who plays as a winger for 1860 Munich.

Career
Greilinger made his professional debut for 1860 Munich on 19 July 2019, coming on as a substitute in the 78th minute for Marius Willsch in a 1–1 home draw against Preußen Münster.

References

External links
 
 

2000 births
Living people
German footballers
Association football wingers
TSV 1860 Munich II players
TSV 1860 Munich players
3. Liga players